Shiran may refer to:
 Shiran, Ardabil
 Shiran, East Azerbaijan
 Shiran Khalji, second Muslim governor of Bengal (d. 1208)
 Shiran Fernando, Sri Lankan cricketer
 Shiran Ratnayake, Sri Lankan cricketer

See also
 Shirán, Peru